First Invasion is the debut EP by South Korean boy band Infinite. It was released on June 9, 2010. They promoted the main single of the EP "Come Back Again" and followed with "She's Back".

Track listing

Charts

Sales and certifications 

Physical sales

References

External links
 
 

2010 debut EPs
Infinite (group) EPs
Korean-language EPs
Woollim Entertainment EPs